Wilderswil railway station is a railway station in the village and municipality of Wilderswil in the Swiss canton of Bern. The station is on the Berner Oberland Bahn, whose trains operate services to Interlaken Ost, Grindelwald and Lauterbrunnen. It is also the valley terminus of the Schynige Platte Railway, whose trains operate to the Schynige Platte and are stabled at a depot bordering the station.

The two lines use different gauges, and there is no physical connection between them. However the trains operate from adjacent platforms within the same station.

Trains in both directions on the Berner Oberland Bahn are scheduled to use Platform 2 alternately. There is a passing loop at the station, which, due to space constraints runs along the top of the platform with the rails embedded in the surface. This line is designated as Platform 1 but is not normally used by trains.

Services 

 the following rail services stop at Wilderswil:

 Regio:

Post bus services connect Wilderswil station to other local places, including a half-hourly service to Interlaken West via Matten bei Interlaken.

References

External links 
 
 Wilderswil station page on the Jungfraubahnen web site
 

Railway stations in the canton of Bern
Bernese Oberland Railway stations
Railway stations in Switzerland opened in 1890